The 1957 NAIA football season was the second season of college football sponsored by the National Association of Intercollegiate Athletics.

The season was played from August to December 1957, culminating in the second annual NAIA Football National Championship, played this year at Stewart Field in St. Petersburg, Florida. During its four years in St. Petersburg, the game was also called the Holiday Bowl.

Pittsburg State defeated  in the championship game, 27–26, to win their first NAIA national title.

Conference standings

Postseason

1957 Holiday Bowl

See also
 1957 NCAA University Division football season
 1957 NCAA College Division football season

References

 
NAIA Football National Championship